Hiroyuki Kanno is a Japanese mixed martial artist. He competed in the Featherweight division.

Mixed martial arts record

|-
| Win
| align=center| 6-4-2
| Hiroshi Yoshida
| Decision (unanimous)
| Shooto - Vale Tudo Access 1
| 
| align=center| 3
| align=center| 3:00
| Tokyo, Japan
| 
|-
| Win
| align=center| 5-4-2
| Masaya Onodera
| Submission (armbar)
| Shooto - Shooto
| 
| align=center| 2
| align=center| 2:31
| Tokyo, Japan
| 
|-
| Draw
| align=center| 4-4-2
| Kenji Ogusu
| Draw
| Shooto - Shooto
| 
| align=center| 3
| align=center| 3:00
| Tokyo, Japan
| 
|-
| Loss
| align=center| 4-4-1
| Noboru Asahi
| Submission (armbar)
| Shooto - Shooto
| 
| align=center| 2
| align=center| 1:05
| Tokyo, Japan
| 
|-
| Loss
| align=center| 4-3-1
| Kenichi Tanaka
| Submission (kimura)
| Shooto - Shooto
| 
| align=center| 3
| align=center| 0:00
| Tokyo, Japan
| 
|-
| Loss
| align=center| 4-2-1
| Kazuhiro Sakamoto
| Submission (armbar)
| Shooto - Shooto
| 
| align=center| 2
| align=center| 1:52
| Osaka, Japan
| 
|-
| Win
| align=center| 4-1-1
| Makoto Mizoguchi
| Submission (armbar)
| Shooto - Shooto
| 
| align=center| 2
| align=center| 2:46
| Tokyo, Japan
| 
|-
| Win
| align=center| 3-1-1
| Kenichi Tanaka
| Decision (unanimous)
| Shooto - Shooto
| 
| align=center| 5
| align=center| 3:00
| Tokyo, Japan
| 
|-
| Draw
| align=center| 2-1-1
| Suguru Shigeno
| Draw
| Shooto - Shooto
| 
| align=center| 3
| align=center| 3:00
| Tokyo, Japan
| 
|-
| Win
| align=center| 2-1
| Masaru Yano
| Submission (kimura)
| Shooto - Shooto
| 
| align=center| 1
| align=center| 0:00
| Tokyo, Japan
| 
|-
| Loss
| align=center| 1-1
| Noboru Asahi
| Submission (armbar)
| Shooto - Shooto
| 
| align=center| 1
| align=center| 0:38
| Tokyo, Japan
| 
|-
| Win
| align=center| 1-0
| Tomoyuki Saito
| Decision (unanimous)
| Shooto - Shooto
| 
| align=center| 3
| align=center| 3:00
| Tokyo, Japan
|

See also
List of male mixed martial artists

References

External links
 
 
 Hiroyuki Kanno  at MixedMartialArts.com
 Hiroyuki Kanno at FightMatrix.com

Japanese male mixed martial artists
Featherweight mixed martial artists
Living people
Year of birth missing (living people)